The Estadio Pedro Bidegain, more often known as El Nuevo Gasómetro, is the home stadium of Club San Lorenzo, located in Bajo Flores neighborhood of Buenos Aires city.

This stadium is the successor of San Lorenzo's old ground, the historic Viejo Gasómetro in nearby Boedo, that had been inaugurated in 1916 and then expropriated by the military government in 1979.

History 
After playing their home games in other stadiums, the Nuevo Gasómetro was inaugurated in a friendly match v Chilean club Universidad Católica. The first official match held in the stadium was San Lorenzo 1 v Belgrano (C) 0.

The stadium was named after Pedro Bidegain, president of the club between 1929 and 1930. The stadium has the bigger field of Argentina, measuring 110 x 70 meters.

Since its inauguration, the stadium has been refurbished several times, starting in 1997 with the construction of new grandstands on its sides. In 2014, the lighting was completely renovated.

Sporting events 
The Pedro Bidegain stadium has not been a current venue for matches of national football teams, with only three games hosted there. National sides to have played at Pedro Bidegain were Bolivia, Colombia, Senegal, and Jordan.

Return to Boedo 
San Lorenzo fans wish to return to their original home (Viejo Gasómetro), and won a court action saying that supermarket chain Carrefour should sell back the land that their supermarket is now built on. In July 2019, the club took ownership of the land where the Viejo Gasómetro stood.

References

External links

 

San Lorenzo de Almagro
P
1993 establishments in Argentina